Scarsdale Inquirer is a local newspaper that was founded in 1901 as a weekly. The first issue was dated July 4, 1901. Their weekly print edition is published on Fridays; the paper's website's daily e-Edition is self-described as "365 days."

History
By 1980 the newspaper was up to its seventh publisher. Its founder died in 1929; the first publisher, who died in 1970, "frequently gave lectures based on Scarsdale history and was appointed historian in 1965."

The Scarsdale Woman's Club was organized in 1918, and one year later they bought and began publishing the paper. They sold it about 40 years later.

From 1980 until his death in 1989, William H. White "was the owner and publisher of the Scarsdale Inquirer." He was succeeded by his daughter Deborah.

Their website is named scarsdalenews.com, and it competes with (and is mentioned by) Scarsdale News and Opinion, a part of 
the patch.com hyperlocal website. The Inquirer is cited by other newspapers.

References

External links
 Official website

Weekly newspapers published in the United States
News websites